Ceratophyllum submersum, commonly known as the soft hornwort or tropical hornwort, is a species of Ceratophyllum. It is a submerged, free-floating aquatic plant. It has been reported from Europe, Central Asia, northern Africa, scattered places in tropical Africa, Turkey, Oman, Florida, and the Dominican Republic. It is similar to the submerged macrophyte Ceratophyllum demersum, a congeneric plant that is found in most regions of the world.

Description 
The C. submersum, is a free floating aquatic plant which forks from stem three to four times and ends have 6 to 8 threadlike tips. Compared to the leaves of C. demersum which fork just one to two times, ends in 3 to 4 tips, as a result the C. submersum has a more delicate look to it. The temperature tolerance is suggested to be between 4°C to 30°C, the optimal temperature is noted to be 15°C to 30°C. The height of the plant is often 6 in. -12 in. (15-30 cm) or 12 in. -18 in. (30-45 cm).

Habitat 
C. submersum prefers to colonize eutrophic waters around agricultural systems. C. submersum is a self-regulating rapid grower like Ceratophyllum demersum. It strives in a moderately lit environment. In a strong lighted environment C. submersum attains an auburn color tint. Carbon dioxide would speed up growth for C. submersum, but it doesn’t require CO2. Since this aquatic plant has a fast growth it has to be trimmed often, or at least be provided a larger tank or environment to accommodate it for proper function. It is found submerged in freshwater in tropical regions of the world, with the species being introduced in newer areas around the world, such as Ireland. It has been found in the Rosetta branch of the Nile River of Egypt, where it thrives in either various locations at different times of the year.

Ecology 
Its presence in waters have been associated with a decrease in nitrogen forms such NH4 and NO3 in water, but an increase in pH, conductivity and dissolved oxygen. While C. demersum has been negatively associated with all phytoplankton classes, C. submersum was positively associated with them, chlorophyll a and Cyanophyceae. C. submersum and C. demersum do not share the same habitat, with the cosmopolitan C. demersum being more distributed, indicating a similar niches. In some cases, C. submersum can overtake C. demersum in one vegetative season in a body of water.

Human uses 
C. submersum is often used in aquariums as a way to decrease nitrogen in artificial aquatic systems. However, it is not as common in usage as the C. demersum. It is propagated by cutting the stem of the plant and placing it in the aquatic system. After the organic matter is converted to soluble inorganic matter the C. submersum helps to oxygenates waste water.

References

External links
 
 

submersum
Freshwater plants
Flora of Europe
Flora of Asia
Flora of Africa
Flora of Florida
Flora of the Dominican Republic
Plants described in 1763
Taxa named by Carl Linnaeus